Richard C Gabriel (born 1927), is a male former rower who competed for England.

Rowing career
He represented England and won a gold medal in the coxed four (as the coxswain) at the 1958 British Empire and Commonwealth Games in Cardiff, Wales.

He was a member of the University College London Boat Club.

References

1927 births
English male rowers
Commonwealth Games medallists in rowing
Commonwealth Games gold medallists for England
Rowers at the 1958 British Empire and Commonwealth Games
Living people
Medallists at the 1958 British Empire and Commonwealth Games